Papaipema maritima, the maritime sunflower borer moth, is a species of moth found in North America. The species was first described by Henry Bird in 1909. The larvae bore into the stems of Helianthus giganteus, forming a stem gall. It is listed as a species of special concern and believed extirpated in the US state of Connecticut.

References

maritima
Moths described in 1909